William Athol Gill (1937–1992), often known as Athol Gill or Dr. Athol Gill, was an influential Australian theologian and one of the leaders of the Australian radical discipleship movement.

Education
Gill attended the NSW Baptist Theological College, Spurgeon's College, and the University of London, obtaining a Bachelor of Divinity degree with Honours in 1965; and thereafter he attended Rüschlikon International Baptist Seminary and the University of Zürich, obtaining a master's degree in 1967 and a D.Theol. degree in 1971.

Professional career
Gill served as a lecturer at the Baptist Theological College of Queensland in 1971-2; with the Methodist Training College in Brisbane in 1973-4; and with Whitley College within the University of Melbourne, initially as Dean of Studies from 1975 to 1979, and then as Professor of New Testament from 1979 until his death in 1992.

Intentional community
Gill was founder of two intentional Christian communities, the House of Freedom in Brisbane and the House of the Gentle Bunyip in Melbourne, both of which were linked informally with the House of the New World in Sydney.

Publications and writings

Recognition
Gill's significance is commemorated in the naming of the Athol Gill Centre, within Whitley College and opened in 2001; in a collection of scholarly essays in honour of Gill, published in 2002; in a biography by fellow theologian Harold Pidwell, published in 2007; and in a commemorative screen by artist David Wong, completed in 2012.

References

Australian Christian theologians
1937 births
Australian biblical scholars
People from Sydney
Alumni of the University of London
1992 deaths